The Branford Connector is an unsigned State Road in the U.S. state of Connecticut.  It serves as a connecting road from Interstate 95 (I-95) to U.S. Route 1 (US 1). The roadway has been numbered State Road 794 by the Connecticut Department of Transportation.

Route description
State Route 794 connects between I-95 and US 1, entirely within the town of Branford, Connecticut. The route is an urban, minor arterial with one lane in each direction. The route has full access control along its entire length. Exit signs on I-95 mark the route as access to US-1, Route 142 to Short Beach, and Route 146.

The route includes an incomplete interchange with I-95. Northbound traffic from I-95 may exit to go eastbound on the connector. Westbound traffic on the Brandford Connector may only merge into southbound I-95. Traffic cannot go from southbound I-95 to the Connector. Nor can traffic from the connector get to northbound I-95.

History
The Branford Connector opened in 1958, at the same time that the Connecticut Turnpike opened. It was designated State Road 994 in 1963. However, in 1964, the designation was changed to State Road 794.

Major intersections

See also

References

External links

 CCTV# 83 - ConnDOT Traffic Camera for exit to the Branford Connector

State highways in Connecticut
Transportation in New Haven County, Connecticut
Branford, Connecticut